NCAA Division II bowl games are American college football bowl games played annually among some of the highest-ranking NCAA Division II football teams not invited to participate in the NCAA Division II Football Championship playoffs. The games are officially recognized by the NCAA. Since 2004, all Division II bowls have been played on the first Saturday in December, three weeks after the final games of the Division II football regular season.

Like the bowl games of the NCAA Division I Football Bowl Subdivision (FBS) that are not integrated into the College Football Playoff National Championship, Division II bowl games are purely "consolation" games, with different conferences supplying teams to different bowls by prior arrangement. Unlike Division I bowl games, they offer no "payout" to the participating schools, are typically played in small venues before small crowds, and must be sustained by the efforts of local sponsors and chambers of commerce. As a result, Division II bowl games have been fewer in number and mostly short-lived. A total of eight different bowls have been contested since 1997, with at least one (and as many as four) being played in any given year.

Background
In 1956 the NCAA College Division was created to serve the athletic needs of the association's smaller member institutions. The division held separate championships in several sports, starting with a basketball tournament at the end of the 1956–57 season. In lieu of a football championship, the division eventually held four regional bowl games from 1964 through 1972, intended to crown the small-college "champions" of different parts of the country. These included the Camellia Bowl for the West; the Grantland Rice Bowl for the Mideast; the Tangerine Bowl (1964–67), then the Boardwalk Bowl (1968–72) for the East; and the Pecan Bowl (1964–70), then the Pioneer Bowl (1971–72) for the Midwest. The Knute Rockne Bowl (1969–72) provided an additional postseason opportunity for the smallest football-playing colleges in the East.

After the reorganization of the NCAA into the present three divisions (I, II, and III) in 1973, Division II began to conduct a postseason football playoff, which in its first five seasons incorporated the former College Division bowl games. The Boardwalk Bowl (1973) served as a quarterfinal game; the Grantland Rice Bowl (1973–77), Pioneer Bowl (1973-75), and Knute Rockne Bowl (1976–77) served as the semifinal games; and the Camellia Bowl (1973–75) and Pioneer Bowl (1976-77) were venues for the championship game. This practice was discontinued after the 1977 season, and for the next twenty years no Division II postseason game carried a "bowl" designation.

History (1997-present)
The current system of Division II bowl games has its origins in 1997, when the Pioneer Bowl was revived as a contest between teams from the division's two conferences of historically black colleges and universities (HBCUs), the Southern Intercollegiate Athletic Conference (SIAC) and the Central Intercollegiate Athletic Association (CIAA). The game moved among five southeastern US cities: first Atlanta, GA, then Mobile, AL, Columbia, SC, Charlotte, NC, and finally Columbus, GA. It was held annually until 2012, except for cancellations in 2002 and 2008.

In 2000, the Mineral Water Bowl became the era's second Division II bowl game. The bowl, held in Excelsior Springs, MO, dated from 1948 (with interruptions) and had been a junior college postseason contest from 1992 to 1999. It included teams from the Northern Sun Intercollegiate Conference (NSIC) and Mid-America Intercollegiate Athletics Association (MIAA), an arrangement that continued through 2017, when it gave way to a matchup between an NSIC team and an at-large team. The game was cancelled in 2020 due to the COVID-19 pandemic and has remained on hiatus since then.

Another former junior college postseason game, the Dixie Rotary Bowl in St. George, UT, became a Division II bowl in 2006, but only lasted three years. From 2006 through 2008, the Rocky Mountain Athletic Conference (RMAC) sent a team to the game; in 2007 and 2008, teams from the Great Northwest Athletic Conference (GNAC) provided the opponent.

From 2009 through 2012, the short-lived Kanza Bowl matched teams from the MIAA and the Lone Star Conference (LSC). The game was held in Topeka, KS.

From 2012 through 2018 (except for a cancellation in 2013), the C.H.A.M.P.S. Heart of Texas Bowl matched a team from the LSC against an at-large team. The game was held in Copperas Cove, TX (2012–17), then Waco, TX (2018). It was played on a double bill with a junior college postseason game which remained active after 2018.

The Live United Texarkana Bowl, founded in 2013, matches a team from the Great American Conference against an opponent from either the MIAA or the LSC. The game is held in Texarkana, AR.

The Heritage Bowl, founded in 2017, matches teams chosen from among the MIAA, LSC, and GAC. The game is held in Corsicana, TX.

America's Crossroads Bowl, founded in 2019, matches teams from the Great Lakes Valley Conference (GLVC) and the Great Midwest Athletic Conference (G-MAC). The game is held in Hobart, IN.

No Division II bowls were played in 2020 due to the COVID-19 pandemic.

Thus far, teams from the remaining six Division II football-playing conferences—the Northeast-10 Conference (NE10), Pennsylvania State Athletic Conference (PSAC), South Atlantic Conference (SAC), Gulf South Conference (GSC), Great Lakes Intercollegiate Athletic Conference (GLIAC), and Mountain East Conference (MEC)—have not participated in Division II bowl games.

Timeline of bowl games

Conference bowl records (1997–present)
Since the onset of the current Division II bowl system, teams from the MIAA have registered the greatest success of any conference, participating in the most bowls (5), the most games (35), and posting the most victories (25).

References

College football bowls
Bowl games